Italian music festivals Below is a list of music festivals in Italy :

Festivals
Agglutination Metal Festival in Sant'Arcangelo Founded in 1995, it is the oldest Metal Music Festival in Italy.
Arena di Verona Opera during the summer months in the Roman amphitheater in Verona.
Arezzo Wave in Arezzo Pop and Rock music founded in 1987.
Dissonanze focused on electronic music, ran from 2000 to 2010.
Festival dei Due Mondi (Festival of the two Worlds) in Spoleto Held since 1957, it has a program of symphonic music, opera, dance and jazz.
Festival della canzone italiana or the San Remo Festival is a popular song contest held in Sanremo since 1951
Festival di Napoli was a Neapolitan song contest which ran from (1952–1971, 1981, 1998–2004)
Festival Verdi, mainly in Parma, is dedicated to the music of Verdi.
Folkest in Spilimbergo
Gods of Metal in Milan
Heineken Jammin Festival in Venice is a pop/rock festival founded in 1998.
Independent Days Festival is a pop/rock festival in Bologna and Milan founded in 1999.
InterHarmony International Music Festival is a classical music festival in Acqui Terme, Piedmont, Italy and InterHarmony was founded in 2007.
Liri Blues Festival Is a Blues festival founded in 1988 held in Isola del Liri, near Rome.
Live Arts Week in Bologna - founded in 2011 when audio visual festival Netmage and contemporary arts festival F.I.S.Co. were combined.
Mandrea Music Festival in Trento. Four day festival of Folk, Reggae, Rock and Electronic music in the Italian Alps overlooking Lake Garda.
Maggio Musicale Fiorentino a selection of classical concerts generally from October through April in Florence.
Music Fest Perugia Classical music in Perugia, 
Pescara Jazz Jazz music Festival in Pescara (from 1969).
Piccola Accademia di Montisi in Montisi, Tuscany takes place every year in July. A festival devoted to the music of the harpsichord and early music/instruments
Pistoia Blues Festival is a blues festival that takes place every July in Pistoia, Tuscany. The first edition was held in 1980
Play It Loud! Festival in Orzinuovi
Porretta Soul Festival in Porretta Terme
Ravello Festival
Rossini Opera Festival in Pesaro is dedicated to the music of Rossini.
Rototom Sunsplash started as a two-day reggae music festival in Gaio di Spilimbergo in 1995, before moving to Benicàssim in Spain in 2009.
Sagra Musicale Malatestiana in Rimini
Surfer Joe Summer Festival is a four-day surf music festival founded in 2003 at Livorno.
Tempo Reale
Umbria Jazz Festival In Perugia, generally in July.

External links
Top 10 Most Important Music Festivals in Italy in 2023

References

 
festivals
Italy
Music
Italy